Manqoba "Shakes" Ngwenya (born 23 March 1981 in Soweto, Gauteng) is a South African football (soccer) midfielder currently playing for Township Rollers in Botswana.

External links
 

1981 births
South African soccer players
Living people
Mamelodi Sundowns F.C. players
Bidvest Wits F.C. players
Association football midfielders
Association football forwards
Sportspeople from Soweto
South Africa international soccer players
Mpumalanga Black Aces F.C. players
Thanda Royal Zulu F.C. players
Notwane F.C. players
Township Rollers F.C. players
South African expatriate soccer players
Expatriate footballers in Botswana
South African expatriate sportspeople in Botswana